Poff may refer to:
 Poff, Virginia, United States
 Tallinn Black Nights Film Festival (Estonian: , PÖFF)
 poff, a command used to control the Point-to-Point Protocol daemon

People 
 John Poff (born 1952), American baseball player
 Jonathan Poff (born 1983), New Zealand rugby union player
 Lon Poff (1870–1952), American actor
 Richard Harding Poff (1923–2011), American politician and judge